Extramarital sex occurs when a married person engages in sexual activity with someone other than their spouse.

The term may be applied to the situation of a single person having sex with a married person.

Where extramarital sexual relations do not breach a sexual norm, it may be referred to as consensual non-monogamy (see also polyamory). 

Where extramarital sexual relations do breach a sexual norm, it may be referred to as adultery or non-monogamy (sexual acts between a married person and a person other than the spouse), fornication (sexual acts between unmarried people), philandery, or infidelity. These terms imply moral or religious consequences, whether in civil law or religious law.

Prevalence
American researcher Alfred Kinsey found in his 1950-era studies that 50% of American males and 26% of females had extramarital sex. Depending on studies, it was estimated that 26–50% of men and 21–38% of women, or 22.7% of men and 11.6% of women had extramarital sex. Other authors  say that between 20% and 25% of Americans had sex with someone other than their spouse. Durex's Global Sex Survey (2005) found that 44% of adults worldwide reported having had one-night extramarital sex and 22% had an affair. According to a 2004 United States survey, 16% of married partners have had extramarital sex, nearly twice as many men as women, while an additional 30% have fantasized about extramarital sex. According to a 2015 study by Durex and Match.com, Thailand and Denmark were the most adulterous countries based on the percentage of adults who admitted having an affair. A 2016 study by the Institute for Family Studies in the US found that black Protestants had a higher rate of extramarital sex than Catholics.

A 2018 US study found that 53.5% of Americans who admitted having extramarital sex did so with someone they knew well, such as a close friend. About 29.4% were with someone who's somewhat well-known, such as a neighbor, co-worker or long-term acquaintance, and the rest were with casual acquaintances. The study also found some gender differences, such as that men are more likely than women to hold more favorable attitudes about extramarital sex, and that among those who reported having extramarital sex in the past year, about 12% of men had paid for sex (or to have received payment for sex) compared to 1% for women.

Other studies have shown rates of extramarital sex as low as 2.5%.

Engagement in extramarital sex has been associated with individuals who have a higher libido (sex drive) than their partner.

Religious views

Judaism

The Torah prescribes the death penalty through stoning for adultery, which is defined as having sex with a woman who is married to another man. The Torah prescribes the punishment to both the man and the women (Leviticus ). Two witnesses of good character had to testify in court for the case to be even considered by the judges. 

Israelite and historic Jewish society was polygynous (one man could have many wives), so the marital status of the man was irrelevant. If a woman, however, is unmarried, a sexual relationship, though highly immoral and sinful from the religion's point of view, is not considered to be adultery, and therefore not punishable by death, but by lashing.

Any physical punishments for any sins were in effect at the times of Judges and the Holy Temple. In rabbinic Judaism, any physical punishment is prohibited by Judaism—as no proper judicial process can be provided until the Holy Temple is rebuilt by the Messiah.

Christianity

Christianity teaches that extramarital sex is immoral and sin. Scriptural foundations for this teaching are passages like  (KJV): 

In Christian marriage, husband and wife publicly promise fidelity to each other until death. Adultery contradicts this promise.

Islam

Traditional interpretations of Islamic law (or Sharia) prescribe severe punishments for zina, or extramarital sex, by both men and women. Premarital sex could be punished by up to 100 lashes, while adultery is punishable by stoning. The act of sexual penetration must, however, be attested by at least four male Muslim witnesses of good character, the accused has a right to testify in court, the suspect's word or testimony is required to hold the most weight in the eyes of the judge(s), punishments are reserved to the legal authorities and the law states that false accusations are to be punished severely. The former regulations also make some Muslims believe, that the process's goal was to eventually abolish the physical penalties relating to acts of fornication and adultery that were already present within many societies around the world when Islamic teachings first arose. According to this view, the principles are so rigorous in their search for evidence, that they create the near impossibility of being able to reach a verdict that goes against the suspect in any manner.

Hinduism
Hinduism condemns extramarital sex as sin.

Law
Extramarital sex is legal in most jurisdictions, but laws against adultery are more common. In the United States, for example, Virginia prosecuted John Bushey for adultery in 2004. Other states allow jilted spouses to sue their ex-partners' lovers for alienation of affections.

Extramarital sex is illegal in some Muslim-majority countries, including Saudi Arabia, Pakistan, Afghanistan, Iran, Kuwait, Maldives, Morocco, Oman, Mauritania, United Arab Emirates, Qatar, Sudan, and Yemen. Indonesia banned extramarital sex in December 2022, but regulations may take up to three years to come into effect.

See also
 Adultery
 Extra-pair copulation
 Honor killing
 On-again, off-again relationship
 Swinging
 One-night stand

References

Sexuality
Marriage
Sex